Macamish Fort is one of several Napoleonic batteries built along the shores of Lough Swilly in county Donegal, to defend the north west of Ireland. It was part of a scheme to fortify Lough Swilly and Lough Foyle against French Invasion during the Revolutionary and Napoleonic Wars and was completed between 1812 and 1813. It was built on a rock outcrop overlooking the lough. It comprises a Martello Tower mounting a single gun and battery mounting three guns. The fort was originally entered by a drawbridge.

After the end of the Napoleonic Wars the defences were neglected and not updated. By the 1860s the Fort was obsolete and disarmed.

The fort remains substantially intact, and is now in use as a private residence.

References

Publications
 
 Col K W Maurice-Jones, 1959. The History of Coast Artillery in the British Army, Royal Artillery Institution, London

Forts in the Republic of Ireland
Buildings and structures in County Donegal
Towers in the Republic of Ireland
Martello towers